Euxoa xasta is a species of cutworm or dart moth in the family Noctuidae first described by William Barnes and James Halliday McDunnough in 1910. It is found in North America.

The MONA or Hodges number for Euxoa xasta is 10821.

References

Further reading

 
 
 

Euxoa
Articles created by Qbugbot
Moths described in 1910